Picrasma excelsa is a species of Picrasma in the family Simaroubaceae. It is found in Cuba, the Dominican Republic, Haiti, Jamaica, Puerto Rico, Saint Vincent and the Grenadines, and Venezuela. It is threatened by habitat loss.

References

excelsa
Vulnerable plants
Flora of Cuba
Flora of the Dominican Republic
Flora of Haiti
Flora of Jamaica
Flora of Puerto Rico
Flora of Saint Vincent and the Grenadines
Flora of Venezuela
Taxonomy articles created by Polbot